Boroaia is a commune located in Suceava County, Western Moldavia, Romania. It is composed of five villages: Bărăști, Boroaia, Giulești, Moișa and Săcuța.

Natives
 Paul Miron

References

Communes in Suceava County
Localities in Western Moldavia